Philippe Presti (born 26 June 1965) is a French sailor. He competed at the  1996 and 2000 Summer Olympics. In 1993 and 1996 he won the Finn Gold Cup.

He sailed for Luna Rossa Challenge in the 2007 Louis Vuitton Cup.

Presti was the sailing coach for Oracle Racing at the 2013 and 2017 America's Cups and for Luna Rossa Prada Pirelli at the 2021 America's Cup.

References

External links
 
 
 

1965 births
Living people
French male sailors (sport)
Olympic sailors of France
Sailors at the 1996 Summer Olympics – Finn
Sailors at the 2000 Summer Olympics – Soling
Oracle Racing sailors
Luna Rossa Challenge sailors
2007 America's Cup sailors
Finn class world champions
World champions in sailing for France
People from Arcachon
Sportspeople from Gironde
20th-century French people
21st-century French people